Linden is a historic home located near Port Tobacco, Charles County, Maryland, United States. It is a rambling frame house, consisting of a -story main block with wings, embodying many traditional characteristics of Tidewater architecture. The house is situated on the crest of a hill overlooking the Port Tobacco Valley.  The home was begun early in the 1780s and enlarged about 1800, and in the late 1830s.  Linden was probably built as a summer residence about 1783, by Henry Barnes, a wealthy Port Tobacco merchant and on a property that remained in the same family for over 300 years.

Linden was listed on the National Register of Historic Places in 1977.

References

External links
, including photo from 1979, at Maryland Historical Trust

Houses in Charles County, Maryland
Houses on the National Register of Historic Places in Maryland
Houses completed in 1783
National Register of Historic Places in Charles County, Maryland